Cláudio Bertolino (born 31 March 1963) is a Brazilian racewalker. He competed in the men's 20 kilometres walk at the 1996 Summer Olympics.

References

1963 births
Living people
Athletes (track and field) at the 1996 Summer Olympics
Brazilian male racewalkers
Olympic athletes of Brazil
Place of birth missing (living people)